This is a complete list of members of the United States House of Representatives during the 5th United States Congress listed by seniority. For the most part, representatives are ranked by the beginning of their terms in office.

As an historical article, the districts and party affiliations listed reflect those during the 5th Congress (March 4, 1797 – March 3, 1799). Seats and party affiliations on similar lists for other Congresses will be different for certain members.

This article describes the criteria for seniority in the House of Representatives and sets out the list of members by seniority. It is prepared on the basis of the interpretation of seniority applied to the House of Representatives in the current congress. In the absence of information to the contrary, it is presumed that the twenty-first-century practice is identical to the seniority customs used during the 5th Congress.

House seniority
Seniority in the House, for Congressmen with unbroken service, depends on the date on which the members first term began. That date is either the start of the Congress (4 March in odd-numbered years, for the era up to and including the 73rd Congress starting in 1933) or the date of a special election during the Congress. Since many members start serving on the same day as others, ranking between them is based on alphabetical order by the last name of the congressman.

Congressmen, in early Congresses, were often elected after the legal start of the Congress. Representatives are attributed with unbroken seniority, from the legal start of the congressional term, if they were the first person elected to a seat in a Congress. The date of the election is indicated in a note.

The seniority date is normally taken from the members entry in the Biographical Directory of the United States Congress, except where the date given is the legal start of the Congress and the actual election (for someone who was not the first person elected to the seat in that Congress) was later. The date of election is taken from United States Congressional Elections 1788-1997. In a few instances the latter work provides dates, for the start and end of terms, which correct those in the Biographical Directory.

The Biographical Directory normally uses the date of a special election, as the seniority date.  However, mostly in early Congresses, the date of the member taking his seat can be the one given. The date of the special election is mentioned in a note to the list below, when that date is not used as the seniority date by the Biographical Directory.

Representatives who returned to the House, after having previously served, are credited with service equal to one less than the total number of terms they served. When a representative has served a prior term of less than two terms (i.e., prior term minus one equals less than one), he is ranked above all others whose service begins on the same day.

Leadership
In this Congress the only formal leader was the Speaker of the House. A Speakership ballot was held on May 15, 1797 and Jonathan Dayton (F-NJ) was re-elected for a second consecutive term.

Standing committees
The House created its first standing committee, on April 13, 1789. There were four standing committees, listed in the rules of the 5th Congress. In addition there was a Ways and Means Committee. Although the Ways and Means Committee was not formally added to the main list of standing committees until 1802, the current committee considers it to be a forerunner.

Committees, in this period, were appointed for a session at a time and not necessarily for every one in a Congress. The Speaker appointed the members.

This list refers to the standing committees of the House in the 5th Congress, the year of establishment as a standing committee, the number of members assigned to the committee and the dates of appointment in each session, the end of the session and its chairman. Chairmen, who were re-appointed after serving in the previous Congress, are indicated by an *.

List of representatives by seniority
A numerical rank is assigned to each of the 106 members initially elected to the 5th Congress. Other members, who were not the first person elected to a seat but who joined the House during the Congress, are not assigned a number.

Four Representatives-elect were not sworn in, as one refused to serve and three resigned. The list below includes the Representatives-elect (with name in italics), with the seniority they would have held if they had been sworn in.

Party designations used in this article are D-R for Democratic-Republican members and F for Federalist representatives. Designations used for service in the first three congresses are (A) for Anti-Administration members and (P) for Pro-Administration representatives.

{|class="wikitable"
|+U.S. House seniority'|- valign=bottom
!Rank!!Representative!!Party!!District!!Seniority date!!Notes
|- 
|colspan="6"| Five consecutive terms|-
|1||Abraham Baldwin|||DR||GA-al||rowspan=5||| (A) 1789–95. Last term while serving as a member of the House.
|-
|2||Thomas Hartley|||F|||| (P) 1789-95
|-
|3||Josiah Parker|||F|||| (A) 1789-93; (P) 1793–95. Elected to this Congress: March 20, 1797.
|-
|4||William L. Smith|||F|||| (P) 1789–95. Chairman: Ways and Means. Resigned on July 10, 1797 while still serving as a member of the House.
|-
|5||George Thatcher|||F|||| (P) 1789–95. Chairman: Revisal and Unfinished Business (1798).
|-
|6||William B. Giles|||DR|||||| (A) December 7, 1790–95. Elected to this Congress: March 20, 1797.Resigned on October 2, 1798 while still serving as a member of the House. Last term while serving as a member of the House until 7th Congress.
|- 
|7||Benjamin Bourne|||F||RI-al|||| (P) December 17, 1790–95. Resigned, as Representative-elect: 1796.
|-
|colspan="6"| Four consecutive terms|-
|8||Jonathan Dayton|||F||NJ-al||rowspan=8||| (P) 1791–95. Speaker of the House. Last term while serving as a member of the House.
|-
|9||William Findley|||DR|||| (A) 1791–95. Last term while serving as a member of the House until 8th Congress.
|-
|10||Andrew Gregg|||DR|||| (A) 1791-95
|-
|11||William B. Grove|||F|||| (P) 1791-95
|-
|12||John W. Kittera|||F|| || (P) 1791-95
|-
|13||Nathaniel Macon|||DR|||| (A) 1791–95. Chairman: Revisal and Unfinished Business (1797).
|-
|14||Jeremiah Smith|||F||NH-al|| (P) 1791–95. Chairman: Revisal and Unfinished Business. Resigned on July 26, 1797 while still serving as a member of the House.
|-
|15||Abraham B. Venable|||DR|||| (A) 1791–95. Elected to this Congress: March 20, 1797. Last term while serving as a member of the House.
|-
|16||William Hindman|||F|||||| (P) January 30, 1793–95. Last term while serving as a member of the House.
|-
|colspan="6"| Three consecutive terms|-
|17||Lemuel Benton|||DR||||rowspan=15||| (A) 1793–95. Last term while serving as a member of the House.
|-
|18||Thomas Blount|||DR|||| (A) 1793–95. Last term while serving as a member of the House until 9th Congress.
|-
|19||Thomas Claiborne|||DR|||| (A) 1793–95. Elected to this Congress: March 20, 1797. Last term while serving as a member of the House until 7th Congress.
|-
|20||George Dent|||F|||| (P) 1793-95
|-
|21||Dwight Foster|||F|||| (P) 1793–95. Chairman: Claims.
|-
|22||James Gillespie|||DR|||| (A) 1793–95. Last term while serving as a member of the House until 8th Congress.
|-
|23||Henry Glen|||F|||| (P) 1793-95
|-
|24||Carter B. Harrison|||DR|||| (A) 1793–95. Elected to this Congress: March 20, 1797. Last term while serving as a member of the House.
|-
|25||Matthew Locke|||DR|||| (A) 1793–95. Last term while serving as a member of the House.
|-
|26||Anthony New|||DR||||rowspan=2| (A) 1793–95. Elected to this Congress: March 20, 1797.
|-
|27||John Nicholas|||DR||
|-
|28||Samuel Smith|||DR|||| (A) 1793–95. Chairman: Commerce and Manufactures (1798).
|-
|29||John E. Van Alen|||F||||  (P) 1793–95. Last term while serving as a member of the House.
|-
|30||Philip Van Cortlandt|||DR|||| (A) 1793-95
|-
|31||Peleg Wadsworth|||F|||| (P) 1793-95
|-
|32||Uriah Tracy|||F||CT-al|||| (P) April 8, 1793–95. Resigned, as Representative-elect: October 13, 1796.
|-
|33||Joshua Coit|||F||CT-al||rowspan=2||| (P) November 11, 1793–95. Chairman: Elections. Died on September 5, 1798 while still serving as a member of the House.
|-
|34||Zephaniah Swift|||F||CT-al|| (P) November 11, 1793–95. Resigned, as a Representative-elect, probably before his term started.
|-
|35||Robert G. Harper|||F|||||| (P) February 9-March 3, 1795. Chairman: Ways and Means (1797). 
|-
|colspan="6"| Three non-consecutive terms|-
|36||Thomas Sumter|||D-R|||||| Previously served (A) 1789-93 while as a member of the House.
|-
|37||Abiel Foster|||F|| NH-al||rowspan=2||| Previously served (P) June 22, 1789-91 while as a member of the House.
|-
|38||John Milledge|||D-R||GA-al|| Previously served (A) November 22, 1792-93 while as a member of the House. Last term while serving as a member of the House until 7th Congress.
|-
|colspan="6"| Two consecutive terms|-
|39||David Bard|||DR||||rowspan=22||| Last term while serving as a member of the House until 8th Congress.
|-
|40||Theophilus Bradbury|||F|||| Resigned on July 24, 1797 while still serving as a member of the House.
|-
|41||Richard Brent|||DR|||| Elected to this Congress: March 20, 1797. Last term while serving as a member of the House until 7th Congress.
|-
|42||Nathan Bryan|||DR|||| Died on June 4, 1798 while still serving as a member of the House.
|-
|43||Daniel Buck|||F|||| Refused to serve, when a Representative-elect 
|-
|44||Dempsey Burges|||DR|||| Last term while serving as a member of the House.
|-
|45||Samuel J. Cabell|||DR|||| Elected to this Congress: March 20, 1797
|-
|46||John Clopton|||DR|||| Elected to this Congress: March 20, 1797. Last term while serving as a member of the House until 7th Congress.
|-
|47||Nathaniel Freeman, Jr.|||DR|||| (F) 1795–97. Last term while serving as a member of the House.
|-
|48||Albert Gallatin|||DR||||rowspan=4|
|-
|49||Chauncey Goodrich|||F||CT-al
|-
|50||Roger Griswold|||F||CT-al
|-
|51||Jonathan N. Havens|||DR|| 
|-
|52||Edward Livingston|||DR|||| Chairman: Commerce and Manufactures (1797)
|-
|53||Samuel Lyman|||F|||| rowspan=2|
|-
|54||John Reed, Sr.|||F||
|-
|55||Samuel Sitgreaves|||F|||| Resigned in 1798 while still serving as a member of the House.
|-
|56||John Swanwick|||DR|||| Died on August 1, 1798 while still serving as a member of the House.
|-
|57||Richard Thomas|||F||||
|-
|58||Mark Thomson|||F||NJ-al|| Last term while serving as a member of the House.
|-
|59||Joseph B. Varnum|||DR|||| Chairman: Elections (1798)
|-
|60||John Williams|||F||||rowspan=2| Last term while serving as a member of the House.
|-
|61||Nathaniel Smith|||F||CT-al||
|-
|62||Richard Sprigg, Jr.|||DR|||||| Last term while serving as a member of the House until 7th Congress.
|-
|...||Elisha R. Potter|||F||RI-al|||| Special election before start of term. Resigned in June 1797 while still serving as a member of the House. Last term while serving as a member of the House until 11th Congress.
|-
|63||William Craik|||F||||rowspan=2|||
|-
|64||Andrew Jackson|||D-R||TN-al|| Resigned, to become a US Senator: September 1797
|-
|65||Samuel Sewall|||F||||||
|-
|66||George Ege|||F|||||| Resigned in October 1797 while still serving  as a member of the House.
|-
|67||Samuel W. Dana|||F||CT-al||||
|-
|68||Thomson J. Skinner|||DR|||||| Last term while serving as a member of the House until 8th Congress.
|-
|colspan="6"| Two non-consecutive terms|-
|69||James Schureman|||F||NJ-al||rowspan=2||| Previously served (P) 1789-91 while as a member of the House. Last term while serving as a member of the House until 13th Congress.
|-
|70||Thomas Sinnickson|||F||NJ-al|| Previously served (P) 1789-91 while as a member of the House. Last term while serving as a member of the House.
|-
|colspan="6"| One term|-
|71||George Baer, Jr.|||F||||rowspan=36|||rowspan=2|
|-
|72||James A. Bayard|||F||DE-al
|-
|73||David Brooks|||F|||| Only term while serving as a member of the House.
|-
|74||Stephen Bullock|||F|||| Elected to this Congress: April 3, 1797. Only term while serving as a member of the House.
|-
|75||Christopher G. Champlin|||F||RI-al|| 
|-
|76||John Chapman|||F|||| Only term while serving as a member of the House.
|-
|77||Matthew Clay|||DR|||| Elected to this Congress: March 20, 1797
|-
|78||James Cochran|||F|||| Only term while serving as a member of the House.
|-
|79||Thomas T. Davis|||DR|||| Elected to this Congress: September 2, 1797
|-
|80||John Dawson|||DR|||| Elected to this Congress: March 20, 1797
|-
|81||John Dennis|||F||||rowspan=2|
|-
|82||Lucas C. Elmendorf|||DR|| 
|-
|83||Thomas Evans|||F|||| Elected to this Congress: March 20, 1797
|-
|84||John Fowler|||DR|||| Elected to this Congress: September 2, 1797
|-
|85||Jonathan Freeman|||F||NH-al||rowspan=3|
|-
|86||William Gordon|||F||NH-al
|-
|87||John A. Hanna|||DR||
|-
|88||David Holmes|||DR|||| Elected to this Congress: March 20, 1797
|-
|89||Hezekiah L. Hosmer|||F|||| Only term while serving as a member of the House.
|-
|90||James H. Imlay|||F||NJ-al|| 
|-
|91||Walter Jones|||DR|||| Elected to this Congress: March 20, 1797. Only term while serving as a member of the House until 8th Congress.
|-
|92||Matthew Lyon|||DR|||| 
|-
|93||James Machir|||F|||| Elected to this Congress: March 20, 1797. Only term while serving as a member of the House.
|-
|94||William Matthews|||F||||rowspan=3| Only term while serving as a member of the House.
|-
|95||Blair McClenachan|||DR||
|-
|96||Joseph McDowell|||DR||
|-
|97||Daniel Morgan|||F|||| Elected to this Congress: March 20, 1797. Only term while serving as a member of the House.
|-
|98||Harrison G. Otis|||F|||| 
|-
|99||Isaac Parker|||F|||| Elected to this Congress: April 3, 1797. Only term while serving as a member of the House.
|-
|100||John Rutledge, Jr.|||F||||rowspan=2| 
|-
|101||William Shepard|||F||
|-
|102||William Smith|||DR|||| Only term while serving as a member of the House.
|-
|103||Richard Stanford|||DR|||| 
|-
|104||Abram Trigg|||DR||||rowspan=2| Elected to this Congress: March 20, 1797
|-
|105||John J. Trigg|||DR||
|-
|106||Robert Williams|||DR|||| 
|-
|colspan="6"| Members joining the House, after the start of the Congress|-
|...||James Davenport|||F||CT-al||rowspan=2||| Previously served December 5, 1796–97. Special election. Died on August 3, 1797 while still serving as a member of the House.
|-
|...||John Allen|||F||CT-al|| Special election. Only term while serving in the House (elected to but did not serve in 6th Congress)
|-
|...||Lewis R. Morris|||F|||||| Special election 
|-
|...||William Edmond|||F||CT-al||rowspan=2||| Special election: September 18, 1797
|-
|...||Thomas Tillinghast|||F||RI-al|| Special election: August 29, 1797. Only term while serving in the House until 7th Congress.
|-
|...||William C. C. Claiborne|||D-R||TN-al||rowspan=2||| Special election: October 15, 1797
|-
|...||Thomas Pinckney|||F|||| Special election: September 4–5, 1797
|-
|...||Bailey Bartlett|||F|||||| Special election: August 4, 1797
|-
|...||Peleg Sprague|||F||NH-al|||| Special election: October 30, 1797
|-
|...||Joseph Hiester|||DR|||||| Special election: October 10, 1797
|-
|...||Jonathan Brace|||F||CT-al||rowspan=3||| Special election: October 22, 1798
|-
|...||Joseph Eggleston|||DR|||| Special election: November 1, 1798
|-
|...||Robert Waln|||F||||rowspan=2| Special election: October 9, 1798
|-
|...||Robert Brown|||DR||||
|-
|...||Richard D. Spaight|||DR|||||| Special election: August 2, 1798
|-
|}

See also
5th United States Congress
List of United States congressional districts
List of United States senators in the 5th Congress by seniority

References

 United States Congressional Elections 1788-1997'', by Michael J. Dubin (McFarland and Company 1998)

External links
House Journal, First Forty-three Sessions of Congress
House of Representatives list of members of the 5th Congress

5
5th United States Congress